Lyn Perkins is a former Welsh international lawn and indoor bowler and coach.

He won a silver medal in the pairs with Spencer Wilshire at the 1982 Commonwealth Games in Brisbane. He is a three times Welsh National Champion, winning the pairs with Wilshire in 1975, 1978 and 1980, when bowling for the Tonypandy Bowls Club.

He was the coach for the lawn bowls team at the 2006 Commonwealth Games in Melbourne.

References

Welsh male bowls players
Bowls players at the 1982 Commonwealth Games
Commonwealth Games silver medallists for Wales
Commonwealth Games medallists in lawn bowls
Living people
Year of birth missing (living people)
Medallists at the 1982 Commonwealth Games